The Mo River is a river of Ghana and Togo, and it arises in Togo and flows west, forming a short part of the international boundary between Ghana and Togo. It empties into Lake Volta in Ghana.

References

Rivers of Ghana
Rivers of Togo
International rivers of Africa
Ghana–Togo border
Border rivers